Deve or DEVE may refer to:
Dèvè, Benin
Deve, a village in the commune of Albac, Romania
European Parliament Committee on Development

People with the name
Deve Toganivalu (1864–1939), Fijian politician
Suzanne Devé (1901–1994), French tennis player
H. D. Deve Gowda (born 1933), former prime minister of India

See also
Deves Insurance, a Thai insurance company